P. gigas  may refer to:
 Pangasianodon gigas, the Mekong giant catfish
 Patagona gigas, the giant hummingbird, a bird species
 Phascolonus gigas, a prehistoric Australian marsupial species
 Phelsuma gigas, the Rodrigues giant day gecko, an extinct diurnal gecko species that lived on the island of Rodrigues
 Paracamelus gigas, an extinct camelid in the genus Paracamelus.

See also
 Gigas (disambiguation)